Haplochromis bayoni is a species of cichlid endemic to Lake Victoria.  This species reaches a length of  SL. The specific name honours the Italian British physician and researcher into sleeping sickness Henry Peter Bayon (1876-1952).

References

bayoni
Fish described in 1909
Taxonomy articles created by Polbot